Isnauda Parish is an administrative unit of Ludza Municipality, Latvia.

Towns, villages and settlements of Isnauda Parish

References 

Parishes of Latvia
Ludza Municipality